Magnus Brahe may refer to:

Magnus Brahe (1564–1633), Swedish nobleman
Magnus Fredrik Brahe (1756–1826), Lord Marshal (Sweden)
Magnus Brahe (1790–1844), Swedish statesman and soldier
Magnus Per Brahe (1849–1930), Knight of the Royal Order of the Seraphim